Hassan Raghab (1904 – 1973) was an Egyptian football midfielder who played for Egypt in the 1934 FIFA World Cup. He also played for Union Recreation Ithad.

References

1904 births
1973 deaths
Egyptian footballers
Egypt international footballers
Association football midfielders
1934 FIFA World Cup players